HMAS Dubbo (FCPB 214), named for the city of Dubbo, New South Wales, was a  of the Royal Australian Navy (RAN).

Design and construction

Main propulsion machinery consisted of two MTU series 538 diesel engines, which supplied  to the two propeller shafts. Exhaust was not expelled through a funnel, like most ships, but through vents below the waterline. The ship's company consisted of 22 personnel. Each patrol boat was armed with a single Bofors 40mm gun as main armament, supplemented by two .50 cal Browning machineguns and an 81-mm mortar, although the mortar was removed from all ships sometime after 1988. The main weapon was originally to be two 30-mm guns on a twin-mount, but the reconditioned Bofors were selected to keep costs down; provision was made to install an updated weapon later in the class' service life, but this did not eventuate.

Dubbo was laid down by NQEA in Cairns, Queensland on 9 August 1982, launched on 21 January 1984 in the presence of Thomas Arthur Slattery and Joan Slattery, then Mayor and Mayoress of Dubbo, and commissioned into the RAN on 10 March 1984.

Fate
The patrol boat was broken up for scrap in Darwin during 2006 and 2007, at a cost of $450,000 to the Australian government.

Citations

References

 The chapter is available separately as Semaphore, Issue 17, 2005 in PDF and HTML formats.

Fremantle-class patrol boats
Ships built in Queensland
1984 ships